is the first episode of the anime series Neon Genesis Evangelion, created by Gainax. The episode was written by the series director Hideaki Anno and directed by Kazuya Tsurumaki. It was originally aired on TV Tokyo on October 4, 1995. The series is mostly set in the futuristic, fortified city Tokyo-3, fifteen years after a worldwide cataclysm named Second Impact. The protagonist is Shinji Ikari, a teenage boy whose father Gendo has recruited him to the organization Nerv to pilot a giant bio-machine mecha named Evangelion to combat beings called Angels. In the episode, Tokyo-3 is attacked by the Angel Sachiel, who fights the United Nations Army and the JSSDF. Gendo summons Shinji for the first time and Shinji reluctantly agrees to pilot the mecha.

Production for "Angel Attack" began in September 1994 and ended in April 1995. The episode, influenced by Japanese tokusatsu, references other mecha anime series and previous works by Gainax. It scored a 6.8% rating of audience share on Japanese TV and received critical and public acclaim focused on its visuals, direction and introduction of the characters.

Plot
Gendo Ikari, commander of a special agency named Nerv, summons his son Shinji to the city of Tokyo-3. Sachiel, the third of a series of mysterious enemies known as Angels, approaches a Japanese city underwater as a Japan Strategic Self-Defense Forces tank battalion awaits it on the shoreline. Shinji, who recently arrived in a nearby town, has remained above ground waiting for Misato Katsuragi, head of the military department of Nerv, who is due to pick him up. The Japan Strategic Self-Defense Forces air force begins to attack the Angel with missiles. Shinji is nearly killed in the ensuing battle but is rescued at the last moment by Misato, who arrives in her car.

The Japan Strategic Self-Defense Forces, admitting their ineffectiveness, transfer responsibility for the Angel's destruction to Gendo and Nerv. Elsewhere, Shinji and Misato in a car train descend deep underground into a Geofront. Shinji is taken to the hangar of a giant mecha named Evangelion, where he is shown Unit 01, the first test type of the Eva series, as Gendo appears above. Shinji learns he has been summoned to pilot Unit 01 into battle against the Angel. He confronts his father and protests his treatment, believing he has no chance of completing the task, but Gendo tells him to pilot the craft or leave. Shinji initially refuses, and Gendo sends for his other pilot Rei Ayanami, who is seriously injured. Confronted with the sight of Rei's injuries, Shinji agrees to pilot the Evangelion, which is then launched from the Geofront into the path of the Angel on a road on the surface.

Production
Gainax began planning the production of Neon Genesis Evangelion in July 1993. On September 20, the first internal meeting about the new project was held at the studio, but production for the first two episodes began in September 1994, a year later the first meeting, and lasted for months. The writing phase was slow, and, according to Evangelion director Hideaki Anno, the first episode's script was completed in six months. Kazuya Tsurumaki, assistant director of Neon Genesis Evangelion, served as director of "Angel Attack"; Anno and Masayuki, who drew storyboards for the episode, assisted him, while Shunji Suzuki worked as chief animator. Yoshitoh Asari, Seiji Kio and Yuh Imakake worked as assistant character designers.

In the first draft, "Angel Attack" had been named . The episode would have begun with Shinji on a train, stopped by a battle between Rei Ayanami's Eva-00 and an Angel named Raziel; the Angel would have vanished into a lake, with the damaged Unit 00 returning to the Nerv base. The beginning of a battle between Raziel and a berserk Unit 01 was also planned, but it was moved to the second episode. Production of "Angel Attack" officially ended in April 1995; one month later, the second episode was also completed. The dubbing sessions began on March 27, about six months before the series was planned to be broadcast. The episodes were later screened in front of two-hundred people at the second Gainax festival on 22 and 23 July 1995 in Itako, Ibaraki, a few months before their official broadcast. According to Gainax co-founder Yasuhiro Takeda, the work was still at an early stage, since "the opening sequence as well as other elements weren't quite ready yet, so the screening showed only the raw episodes".

Miki Nagasawa, Megumi Hayashibara, Akiko Hiramatsu, Takehito Koyasu, and Takashi Nagasako played several announcements and unnamed characters in "Angel Attack", while Tomomichi Nishimura, Hidenari Ugaki and Hiroshi Naka voiced the three soldiers who speaks with Gendo in the first scenes. British singer Claire Littley  also sang a cover of "Fly Me to the Moon" which was later used as the episode's closing theme song.

Cultural references and themes 

Gualtiero Cannarsi, who cured the first Italian adaptation of the series, noted that "Angel Attack" story starts in medias res, a narrative technique used in the following episodes of the anime by which, by means of flashbacks or the speeches and thoughts of the characters, what happened before the beginning of the narrative is reconstructed. He also noted that in one scene of the episode Shinji pronounces the phrase "I mustn't run away", which will become one of the most typical of the character. Hiroki Azuma, a Japanese philosopher and cultural critic, speaking of his motto "I mustn't run away", described Evangelion as a story that depicts "anxiety without a cause", linking this feeling to the social repercussions in Japan after the Aum Shinrikyō Tokyo subway sarin attack. The sentence is inspired by the personal experience of Hideaki Anno, who faced a hard time in the four years before the series' release and then returned to anime with the same idea. For Yasuhiro Takeda, a member of the Gainax studio, "what we saw in Evangelion was maybe just a reflection of those feelings". For the phrase "I mustn't run away", according to Takeda, the director took inspiration from an old failed Gainax project, Blue Uru. "Angel Attack" also presents the themes of father-son relationships and interpersonal communication.

Yūichirō Oguro, editor of extra materials from the home video editions of the series, noted how in "Angel Attack" Misato tells Shinji to act like a man, a theme also presented later in the series. According to an official booklet on the anime, it is unclear if the series supports the patriarchal model or discusses its value instead. The episode also presents references to earlier anime works, including Lupin III, Combattler V and GunBuster. Akio Jissoji's directorial style informed the installment, along with shots influenced by the tokusatsu genre. Humorous graphic symbols that are typical of shojo anime were used, drawing inspiration from the works of Kunihiko Ikuhara. "Angel Attack" also depicts existing military vehicles, including Japanese Type 74 tanks, Yak-38-inspired VTOLs, nacelle-less gyroplanes and M270 MLRS missile launchers.

Reception
{{quote box |quote=First episodes can make or break a series. Few anime premieres do a better job of setting up the players and crisis than Evangelion''''s opening episode. ... Evangelion is a rush of drama and excitement right from the start with the end of the world scenario and the "special" child who must save the world, making for an especially lovely touch. |source=–Max Covill (Film School Rejects) |width=35%}}

The episode received critical and public acclaim. Gainax premiered "Angel Attack", along with the second episode, in a preview at the second Gainax festival on July 22 and 23, 1995, receiving a positive reception. The episode was first broadcast on October 4, 1995, and scored a 6.8% rating of audience share on Japanese television. After the series' first run, it ranked seventeenth among the best anime episodes of the moment in an Animage magazine Grand Prix poll. The scene in which Shinji meets Rei Ayanami for the first time also ranked sixteenth in a survey by TV Asahi about the best anime scenes. Official merchandise based on the episode has been released, including lighters, T-shirts and reproductions of the battle against Sachiel.

Critics, including animator Yūichirō Oguro writing for Newtype magazine and Anime News Network's Nick Creamer, appreciated the episode's direction and editing. Academic Susan J. Napier described the depiction of Shinji's and Misato's "inner world" in "Angel Attack" as an example of the series' unconventionality. Italian writer and critic Andrea Fontana wrote; "From the first episode, every detail [in Neon Genesis Evangelion] overflows with many meanings". Comic Book Resources criticized the depiction of the futuristic scenario, but defended Shinji and his reluctance to face the task of protecting humanity in "Angel Attack" from some criticisms made by animation enthusiasts. Kristy Anderson, writing for Supanova Expo website, picked his decision to ride Eva-01 as one of the character's best moments. Joshua Sorensen of Filmdaze.net also defended Shinji, describing the "I must not run away" scene as "the crux of everything that makes the show the singularity that it is". Film School Rejects' Max Covill similarly placed "Angel Attack" third among the best Neon Genesis Evangelion episodes, praising it for its visuals and introduction of mysteries of the series; he also lauded one shot of Shinji reading a book with the hand of an Evangelion in the background, listing it among the "perfect shots" of the series.

The Animé Café's Japanese reviewer Akio Nagatomi described the animation as "average" for a TV serial and praised "some interesting creature and mecha design", but also criticized the premise of the story of a young boy who fights alien beings as excessively derivative. The December 1995 issue of Newtype magazine lauded the episode's dense amount of information, but also noticed "it can confuse some viewers". SyFy Wire's Daniel Dockery described Sachiel's debut as "terrifying", but considered it reminiscent of "a bunch of giant monster tropes". Newtype wrote, "the many elaborate camera angles may tickle fans hearts" and "the eye-catching titles are also well placed". Multiversity Comics' Matthew Garcia similarly praised the confidence in the film-making and the animation of "Angel Attack" and "The Beast", eulogizing the "assurance and tenacity" of Anno and Gainax. Ex magazine's Charles McCarter lauded the animation as "nice and clean", the soundtrack and the pace of the first two episodes. According to the Newtype's official Evangelion film books, the scene in which Gendo takes command on the battle against Sachiel also received a positive reception for its "expressiveness", being "considered one of the best-executed of this episode".

Kinoko Nasu, writer of Mahōtsukai no Yoru and Fate/stay night'', began his career as a writer after seeing "Angel Attack", an episode that according to him "can't have been ignored by neither I nor my contemporaries".

References
  Text was copied/adapted from Episode 01 at Evageeks wiki, which is released under a Creative Commons Attribution-Share Alike 3.0 (Unported) (CC-BY-SA 3.0) license.

External links
 

1995 Japanese television episodes
Neon Genesis Evangelion episodes
Science fiction television episodes